Isaak Hayik (יצחק חייק; born 13 April 1945) is an Israeli entrepreneur, author, illustrator, and footballer. He became the world's oldest professional football player when he played for Ironi Or Yehuda as a goalkeeper at the age of 73.

Early life and family 
Hayik was born in an affluent Jewish family in Iraq. His father, Moshe Hayik, was a physician. They settled in the transit camp (slums) of Or Yehuda. Since then, Isaac is inseparable from Or Yehuda. Isaac Hayik married Idit, the daughter of Mordechai Ben-Porat, mayor of Or Yehuda and later Knesset Member and government minister. Idit and Isaac Hayik had three children. Isaac's younger brother, Shaul, became a successful footballer. Isaac Hayik was a player for Hakoah Maccabi Ramat Gan, when it won the 1968–1969 Israel State Cup. He studied education and history.

Author, illustrator, and youth counselor  
Hayik engaged in graphical design and became the caricaturist of the daily newspapers Hadshot HaSport in Hebrew and Al-Yaum in Arabic. He also illustrated several books.

He wrote his first book, The Next War (Ramdor, 1968), when he was only 23. The book was written in the euphoric Israeli period after the Six Day War and described the Soviet-backed Arab surprise attack on Israel, and the IDF victory over its armies. It was originally published in chapters in the Iraeli newspaper of record, Haaretz. His second book, The End of the Earth (Ramdor, 1969), was a science fiction book that described a worldwide war and the extermination of most of humanity, with aliens also joining it towards the end of the war. His third book, Our Woman in Moscow (Chechik, 1970), described the activities of the Mossad in the Soviet Union.

Alongside, from 1965 to 1980, he worked as a youth counselor in Or Yehuda.

Business and football career 
In 1980 Hayik founded Hayik Bamot, a company that became the largest supplier in Israel for stages, decors and props for events, shows, rallies and ceremonies. In response to the refusal of several actors to perform at the Ariel Theater, he announced that his company would no longer podvide stages and decors for theater that refused to perform at the Ariel.

He served as the manager of Maccabi Or Yehuda team in the third division and played as a goalkeeper for the Elitzur Yehud team. As of 2019, he serves as the goalkeeper of Maccabi Or Yehuda and is the oldest goalkeeper in the country. In April 2019 he entered the Guinness Book of Records as the oldest football player of all time, at the age of 74.

References

Israeli footballers
Iraqi footballers
Iraqi Jews
Living people
1945 births
Association football goalkeepers
Israeli illustrators
Israeli businesspeople
Israeli people of Iraqi descent
Israeli caricaturists
Israeli historians
Israeli educators
Israeli graphic designers
Israeli football managers